The Latonia Derby was an American Thoroughbred horse race run annually from 1883 through 1937 at Latonia Race Track in Latonia, Kentucky. Open to three-year-old horses, for its first 52 years the Latonia Derby was contested at a mile and a half then in 1935 the distance was shortened to a mile and a quarter. It was run as the Hindoo Stakes from inception in 1883 to 1886 in honor of the Kentucky-bred U.S. Racing Hall of Fame horse, Hindoo. The race usually attracted the Kentucky Derby winner; it became so popular that in 1912 a motion picture was made by Independent Motion Picture Co. entitled Winning the Latonia Derby, featuring silent film star King Baggot.

The inaugural 1883 Latonia Derby was won by Kentucky Derby winner Leonatus. Future Derby winners Kingman (1891), Halma (1895), Ben Brush (1896), Lieut. Gibson (1900), Elwood (1904) and Sir Huon (1906) also won the race; the 1918 edition was won by Harry Payne Whitney's Belmont Stakes-winning colt, Johren. In 1936, Rushaway won the Illinois Derby during the afternoon, then was shipped  overnight to win the Latonia Derby the following afternoon.

Records
Speed record: 
 1¼ miles (1935-1937) : 2:02 3/5 - Rushaway (1936)
 1½ miles (1883-1934) : 2:28 3/5 - Handy Mandy (1927)

Most wins by a jockey:
 5 - Isaac Murphy (1883, 1885, 1886, 1887, 1891)

Most wins by a trainer: ¹
 2 - Albert Cooper (1886, 1888)
 2 - Robert Tucker (1893, 1901)
 2 - Peter W. Coyne (1906, 1912)
 2 - Auval John Baker (1910, 1914)
 2 - Kay Spence (1923, 1930)
¹ At present, one trainer is missing from the table's list.

Most wins by an owner:
 2 - E. J. "Lucky" Baldwin (1886, 1888)
 2 - Scoggan Brothers (1889, 1893)
 2 - Bashford Manor Stable (1906-1912)
 2 - Harry P. Whitney (1918, 1920)
 2 - Audley Farm Stable (1923, 1930)
 2 - Edward R. Bradley (1925, 1926)

Winners

 * 1900: Walkover, no time taken.
 ** 1888: Dead Heat runoff won by Los Angeles over White.

References

External links
 Winning the Latonia Derby at IMDb

Discontinued horse races
Horse races in Kentucky
Recurring sporting events established in 1883
Recurring sporting events disestablished in 1937
1883 establishments in Kentucky
1937 disestablishments in Kentucky